This is a list of government schools in Victoria, Australia.

Primary schools

Secondary schools

Defunct schools

 Bonbeach High School
 Broadmeadows Secondary College merged into Hume Central Secondary College
 Croydon Secondary College merged into Melba College
 Doveton Heights Primary School
 Doveton North Primary School
 Echuca South Primary School
 Echuca West Primary School
 Erinbank Secondary College merged into Hume Central Secondary College
 Eumemmerring Primary School
 Gilmore College for Girls
 Glen Devon Primary School
 Glen Orden Primary School
 Haig Street Primary School
 Hawthorn Secondary College closed and then re-opened as Auburn High School
 Heidelberg West Primary School
 Hillcrest merged into Hume Central Secondary College
 Hopetoun Primary School
 Lalor Park Primary School
 Maroondah Secondary College merged into Melba College
 Merrilands College merged into William Ruthven Secondary College
 Moe High School merged into Lowanna College
 Monash Secondary College
 Mooroolbark Primary School
 Newborough High School merged into Lowanna College
 Oakleigh High School
 Sale High School merged into Sale College
 Shepparton High School
 Yallourn Technical College merged into Lowanna College

References 

Lists of schools in Victoria (Australia)